Stephen or Steve(n) Clark(e) may refer to:

Arts and entertainment
 Stephen Carlton Clark (1882–1960), art collector and president of the Baseball Hall of Fame
 Steve Clark (tap dancer) (1924–2017), member of the tap-dancing duo The Clark Brothers
 Stephen Clarke (writer) (born 1958), British journalist and novelist
 Steve Clarke (drummer) (born 1959), British rock and heavy metal drummer
 Steve Clark (1960–1991), British guitarist for rock band Def Leppard
 Stephen Clark (playwright), British playwright, librettist and lyricist
 Steven A. Clark, American pop and R&B singer, active 2011–present
 Stephen Clark (musician), American bassist for heavy metal band Deafheaven
 Steve Clarke, British rock bassist for Dumdums
 Steve Clark (animator), animator and director of animated television series
 Stephen Clarke-Willson, video game and software developer
 Steve Clarke (EastEnders), fictional character in the British soap opera Eastenders

Politics
 Stephen Clark (New York treasurer) (1792–?), New York State Treasurer 1856–1857
 Stephen D. Clark (1916–1997), Canadian politician, New Brunswick 
 Stephen P. Clark (1924–1996), Mayor of Miami, Florida
 Stephen R. Clark (born 1966), American federal judge from Missouri
 Steve Clark (Canadian politician) (born 1960), Canadian politician, Ontario
 Steve Clark (Arkansas politician), Arkansas Attorney General

Sports 
 Steve Clark (swimmer) (born 1943), American swimmer
 Stevan Clark (born 1959), American football defensive end
 Steve Clark (American football, born 1960), American pro football tackle
Steve Clark (defensive back) (born 1962), American football defensive back
 Steven Clark (Australian footballer) (1961–2005), VFL/AFL player for three clubs
 Steve Clarke (born 1963), Scottish football player and manager
 Stephen Clarke (swimmer) (born 1973), Canadian swimmer
 Steven Clark (English footballer) (born 1982), English footballer
 Steven Clark (cricketer) (born 1982), Leicestershire cricketer
 Steve Clark (soccer) (born 1986), American soccer player
 Steven Clarke (gridiron football) (born 1991), Canadian football defensive back
 Steve Clark (referee), rugby referee

Others 
 Stephen C. Clark (bishop) (1892–1950), bishop of the Episcopal Diocese of Utah
 Stephen R. L. Clark (born 1945), British philosopher
 Steven Clarke (born 1949), biochemist
 Stephen Clarke (archaeologist), Welsh archaeologist

See also 
 Stephen Clark Foster (1822–1898), mayor of New York City
 Stephen Clark Foster (Maine politician) (1799–1872), U.S. representative from Maine
 Shooting of Stephon Clark, 2018 shooting in Sacramento, California involving a man similarly named Stephon Clark